Like the championship, the first edition of the Cup had a tight schedule as the Football Federation of Ukraine was given just several months in order to switch to the European seasonal format with the minimum required matches played.

The competition started on February 10 and the final was played on May 31. Only the clubs participants of the Supreme and First Leagues competed this season. It was the first National Cup edition replacing the previous competition of the Ukrainian SSR Cup, which was organized as a regional qualification competition for the Soviet Cup. The last winner of that Soviet competition FC Temp Shepetivka was eliminated in the first preliminary round by Kremin Kremenchuk. Simultaneously, three of the participating Ukrainian clubs were still competing in the Soviet Cup. The first trophy was won by Chornomorets Odessa thus qualifying to the qualification round of UEFA Cup Winners' Cup.

Organization 
It was decided that the Cup would start with 16 teams and six Soviet Top League participants would gain direct qualification, while the other 10 teams had to qualify through couple of preliminaries with Azovets Mariupol gaining bye round.

Forty-five teams participated in the first Cup with 19 pairs in the first preliminary round and 10 in the second. The winner of the competition gained a chance to qualify for the UEFA Cup Winner's Cup competition.

The preliminary rounds and the final consisted of only one game while the other three had a home-away fixture scheduled.

Participating teams
 1992 Ukrainian Premier League (20)
 1992 Ukrainian First League (25) (except for the second teams)

Distribution

Brief overview 
The tournament started on February 10, 1992, with the game between Podillia Khmelnytsky and Bukovyna Chernivtsi right in the middle of the Zakarpattia Oblast in the village of Ilnytsia and culminated in the final game in Kyiv on May 31, 1992. With the organization of the Ukrainian Cup competition the three Ukrainian clubs Dynamo Kyiv, Chornomorets Odessa, and Metalist Kharkiv that still were in competition of the Soviet Cup with their Quarterfinals games scheduled on March 25, 1992, had those fixtures canceled, abandoning that competition.

The highest attending game happened to be in the Round of 16 when FC Skala Stryi were playing against FC Dynamo Kyiv in the city of Stryi in front of 17,000 spectators. Skala lost that game in the overtime by the goal from Oleg Salenko. Even the final game attendance of 12,000 could not beat that festival of sport in the small city of the Lviv Oblast. The lowest attendance of the competition was in the game between Kolos Nikopol and Polissia Zhytomyr which took place on February 16, 1992, just outside the city of Nikopol in Chkalove village and was witnessed only by 150 people. The highest scoring game took place in Odessa when the local Chornomorets avenged its poor performance in Zhytomyr by beating Polissia 7:1. The biggest margin in goals scored was recorded in Zaporizhia when the local Metalurh won over Vahonobudivnyk 7:0. The most surprising was the elimination of the Soviet Cup participant Dynamo Kyiv that lost its quarterfinal stand off against the Zaporizhian Automakers 1:2 in aggregate.

Competition schedule

First preliminary round 
All games took place on February 16, 1992, except the game in Zakarpattia between Podillia – Bukovyna which took place on February 10, 1992.

All 39 clubs out 45 took part in this round. The other six clubs, participants of the Soviet Top League, received bye for the next two rounds to the Round of 16. The 39 clubs played off for another 10 passes.

Second preliminary round 
Most of games took place on February 23, 1992. The game in Crimea between Polissia – Stal took place on February 21, 1992, and the game in Bukovyna between Bukovyna – Azovets took place on February 28, 1992.

Bracket

Round of 16 

|}

First leg 

Note: FC Chornomorets Odesa has fielded its second team coached by Vitaliy Sidnev playing in the First League (2nd tier) same as Polissia, because the first team was on a field trip.

Second leg 

Chornomorets won 8–5 on aggregate.

Metalurh won 7–1 on aggregate.

Torpedo won 6–1 on aggregate.

Dynamo won 3–2 on aggregate.

Shakhtar won 4–1 on aggregate.

Dnipro won 5–2 on aggregate.

Metalist won 4–1 on aggregate.

Naftovyk won 2–1 on aggregate.

Quarterfinals (1/4) 

|}

First leg

Second leg 

Metalist won 2–1 on aggregate.

Chornomorets won 3–1 on aggregate.

Torpedo won 2–1 on aggregate.

Shakhtar won 6–1 on aggregate.

Semifinals (1/2) 

|}

First leg

Second leg 

Chornomorets won 3–1 on aggregate.

Metalist won 2–1 on aggregate.

Final

Cup holders 
(league appearances and goals listed in brackets)

  Yuriy Sak also scored one own goal.
  In its first game against Pollisya Chornomorets played with its reserves led by Vitaliy Sidnev.
 Note: Only Bukel received a yellow card.

Top goalscorers 

.

Goalkeeping leaders 
Wins

Attendances

Top attendances

See also 
 Ukrainian Premier League 1992
 Ukrainian First League 1992

References 

1991–92
Cup
Ukrainian Cup